Superbia is a 2016 Hungarian animated short film directed by Luca Tóth. The film had its premiere at the 69th Cannes Film Festival, and later competed at film festivals like Palm Springs International Film Festival, Chicago International Film Festival and Sarajevo Film Festival, and won the Best Hungarian Animation Award at the 5th Friss Hús Budapest International Short Film Festival.

Plot 
According to the official synopsis, in the short "the native people of the land of Superbia, where men and women form separate societies, face the changes sparked by the first equal couple in their history".

References

External links 
 
 

2016 short films
2010s animated short films
Hungarian animated short films
2010s feminist films
2016 films